The Muloza–Chiringa Road is a road in the Southern Region of Malawi, connecting the towns of Muloza in Mulanje District, and Chiringa, in Phalombe District.

Location
The road starts at Muloza as the T-415 road and progresses at first, in a general north-easterly direction, hugging the Ruo River and the Malawi/Mozambique border.

Overview
This road is important as it connects the international border town of Muloza to the interior of Malawi. Before 2019, the road had a gravel surface. In 2019, the government of Malawi, using internally generated funds, began upgrading the road to grade II bitumen surface with shoulders, culverts, and drainage channels. The work was contracted in phases. The first phase which started in April 2019, is expected to last 18 months until October 2020.

See also
 List of roads in Malawi
 Transport in Malawi

References

External links
 Mpinganjira Says No Compensation As Chiringa–Muloza Road Upgrading Begins As of 7 May 2019.   
 Living in Malawi, served by Mozambique As of 6 October 2018.

Roads in Malawi
Mulanje District
Phalombe District
Southern Region, Malawi